Everton Giovanella (born 13 September 1970) is a Brazilian retired footballer who played as a defensive midfielder.

He was best known for tireless physical display, and played most of his professional career in Spain – one full decade – namely being an important part in Celta's domestic and European consolidation.

Club career
Giovanella was born in Caxias do Sul, Rio Grande do Sul. Having started playing with a modest club in native Brazil he signed with Série A's Sport Club Internacional in Porto Alegre, with little impact. In the middle of 1993 he emigrated to Portugal, playing one season each with Primeira Liga sides F.C. Tirsense, G.D. Estoril Praia and C.F. Os Belenenses.

For the 1996–97 campaign Giovanella moved to Spain, first achieving La Liga promotion with UD Salamanca then moving to RC Celta de Vigo. At both teams, he reunited with former Belenenses teammate Catanha and, with the Galicians, played an important role in their domestic and European exploits, but also unluckily injured Deportivo de La Coruña's Manuel Pablo in a derby on 30 September 2001.

In December 2004 (sanction ratified in September 2005), Giovanella was banned from football for two years after testing positive for nandrolone. On 10 November 2007 he returned to football, teaming up for Tercera División side Coruxo FC.

Giovanella rejoined his very first senior club Clube Esportivo Lajeadense in the 2008 off-season, as its director of football. In the following year he returned to Celta, being appointed scout in his country.

Honours
Celta
UEFA Intertoto Cup: 2000

See also
List of sportspeople sanctioned for doping offences

References

External links

Celta de Vigo biography 

1970 births
Living people
Brazilian people of Italian descent
Naturalised citizens of Spain
Brazilian footballers
Association football midfielders
Campeonato Brasileiro Série A players
Sport Club Internacional players
Primeira Liga players
F.C. Tirsense players
G.D. Estoril Praia players
C.F. Os Belenenses players
La Liga players
Segunda División players
Tercera División players
UD Salamanca players
RC Celta de Vigo players
Coruxo FC players
Brazilian expatriate footballers
Expatriate footballers in Portugal
Expatriate footballers in Spain
Brazilian expatriate sportspeople in Portugal
Brazilian expatriate sportspeople in Spain